The Ruo–Ndiza Hydroelectric Power Station is an operational  hydroelectric power plant in southeastern Malawi, at the border with Mozambique.

Location
The power station is located across the confluence of the Ruo River and its tributary, the Ndiza River, in Mulanje District, in the Southern Region of Malawi, at the international border with the Republic of Mozambique.

Overview
This has exposed the country to severe, recurrent load-shedding.

Mulanje Renewable Energy Plc (also Mulanje Hydro Limited), a private energy-generating company, domiciled in Malawi,  contracted Gilkes, a British electric turbine manufacturer to build this power station, over a two-year period.

Technical details
The power station is a run-of-river design which does not require a dam and therefore no need for a reservoir. One was installed on the Ndizi River, during the first phase. Due to the water flow rates on this small river, only 1.65 megawatts could be extracted.

The second phase included the installation of two more Pelton turbines each rated at 3.3 megawatts, across the Ruo River, yielding a total of 6.6 megawatts in new energy generation. The total output of the power complex is 8.25 megawatts.

Construction
The construction budget has been reported at US$16 million. Construction began in June 2018 and concluded in April 2020. The power generated is sold to the national power distributor Electricity Supply Commission of Malawi (Escom), under a long-term power purchase agreement.

See also

 List of power stations in Malawi

References

External links
Brief Description

Dams in Malawi
Mulanje District
Southern Region, Malawi
Hydroelectric power stations in Malawi
2020 establishments in Malawi
Energy infrastructure completed in 2020
Proposed renewable energy power stations in Malawi